John Tristropp   was an Oxford college head in the 15th-century.

Tristropp was Rector of Lincoln College, Oxford from 1479 to 1488. He is buried at St Michael's Church, Oxford.

References

Rectors of Lincoln College, Oxford
15th-century English people